Kangerlussuaq may refer to the following areas in Greenland:

Fjords 
 Kangerlussuaq Fjord, a long fjord in western Greenland
 Kangerlussuaq Icefjord, a fjord in Upernavik Archipelago in northwestern Greenland
 Kangerlussuaq Fjord (Kangeq Peninsula), a fjord in Upernavik Archipelago in northwestern Greenland
 Kangerlussuaq Fjord, East Greenland, a fjord in eastern Greenland 
 Kangerlussuaq Glacier, the largest glacier in eastern Greenland
 Inglefield Fjord, NW Greenland

Settlement 
 Kangerlussuaq, a settlement in western Greenland, with the Kangerlussuaq Airport.

See also 
 Sondrestrom (disambiguation)
 Søndre Strømfjord (disambiguation)